The 1922 West Virginia Mountaineers football team was an American football team that represented West Virginia University as an independent during the 1922 college football season. In its second season under head coach Clarence Spears, the team compiled a 10–0–1 record, shut out seven of its eleven opponents, and outscored all opponents by a total of 267 to 34.  The team also played in the school's first bowl game, defeating Gonzaga, 21–13, in the San Diego East-West Christmas Classic.

Schedule

References

West Virginia
West Virginia Mountaineers football seasons
College football undefeated seasons
West Virginia Mountaineers football